Monmore Green Stadium is a greyhound racing and speedway stadium located in Wolverhampton. The stadium has private suites, a restaurant and a number of bars. The venue is owned and operated by the Ladbrokes Coral group.

Speedway

Motorcycle speedway is raced there on Monday nights with the Wolverhampton Wolves competing in the top division of the sport, the Elite League where the team is captained by Speedway Grand Prix rider, Sweden's Fredrik Lindgren. Other riders who have ridden for the Wolves over the years include Britain's twice Speedway World Champion Tai Woffinden, multiple World Champions Ole Olsen and Hans Nielsen from Denmark, 1993 World Champion Sam Ermolenko of the United States and assorted others including England's Andy Grahame, Australians Jim Airey and Mark Fiora and America's 1982 World Pairs Champions Dennis Sigalos and Bobby Schwartz.

On some alternate Monday nights, National League team Cradley Heathens also race at Monmore Green (Affectionately nicknamed Monmore Wood in tribute to Dudley Wood).

Greyhound racing
Matinée races take place on Monday, Tuesday, Wednesday and Fridays with evening race meetings on Thursday and Saturday nights. The track hosts several major races including the Ladbrokes Gold Cup, Ladbrokes Puppy Derby, Ladbrokes Festival 630's, Ladbrokes Summer Cup and from 2015 the prestigious puppy competition the Trafalgar Cup.

The track features prominently in the song "Monmore, Hare's Running" on the 1997 album Voyage to the Bottom of the Road by the band Half Man Half Biscuit.

History

20th Century
Monmore opened in 1928 south-east of Wolverhampton and south of the Sutherland Road between the Great Western Railway line and East Park (a large sculptured park and gardens). The official opening night was Wednesday 11 January 1928 organised by a company called the Midland Greyhound Racing Association. A 10,000 strong crowd witnessed the seven races including two hurdle events and the first greyhound to win a race was Arrow Tranby winning one of the 500 yards races in a time of 32.08 secs at odds of 6-1 when winning the Shirley Stakes.

In 1935 the large resident Monmore kennels were split into two sections and also served Willenhall Greyhound Stadium. Unlike many tracks Monmore remained open during the majority of the war and introduced the Midland Puppy Championship in 1943, which would become the Midland Puppy Derby and then the Ladbrokes Puppy Derby (not to be confused with the more prestigious Puppy Derby held at Wimbledon Stadium). The company ran a policy of having joint Racing Managers covering both Monmore and Willenhall. In the fifties Peter Cartwright left his position as Racing Manager to join the National Greyhound Racing Club and was replaced by Bob Harwood. Further competitions were introduced at the track that included the Midland St Leger, Midland Classic Potential, Pride of the Midlands and Staffordshire Knot.

In 1963 a devastating fire swept through the main grandstand resulting in the closure of the track for a considerable period whilst repairs were made. The annual Midland Puppy Championship had to be switched to Willenhall. The fire instigated a major change with the grandstand undergoing significant investment in the mid-sixties to include an ultra-modern glass fronted restaurant with tiered viewing and waitress service. It brought the facilities up to date and attracted outside interest from the Totalisators and Greyhound Holdings (TGH). In 1970 TGH purchased Willenhall and Monmore from the Midland Greyhound Racing Co Ltd to add to the existing tracks of Crayford & Bexleyheath, Gosforth, Leeds and Brough Park that they already owned. Four years later in 1974 Ladbrokes bought out TGH and added another racetrack Perry Barr. Arthur Aldridge became Racing Director for Ladbrokes and following the 1981 decimation of horse racing fixtures due to bad weather the track held BAGS (Bookmakers’ Afternoon Greyhound Service) fixtures for the first time.

The tracks resident kennels were demolished in the late eighties making way for the contract trainer system and Jim Woods arrived from Nottingham Greyhound Stadium to take over as Racing Manager with Bob Harwood General Manager. The stadium hosted the Golden Jacket classic race in 1986 before it moved to Crayford Stadium and a pre-war event the Midland Gold Cup returned in 1994. The stadium underwent changes in 1996 including a change of hare system from a Sumner to a Swaffham.

21st Century
2011 was a very successful year for the track when they won the BAGS National Track Championship  and trainer Chris Allsopp became champion trainer. In 2013 Jim Woods retired after a 31-year career handing the reigns to Tony Williamson. The prestigious Trafalgar Cup competition was held for the first time in 2015.

In 2018 the stadium signed a deal with SIS to race every Monday, Tuesday, Wednesday and Friday afternoon and every Thursday and Saturday evening. Leading trainer Kevin Hutton joined the track in August 2018.

Major competitions 
Ladbrokes Gold Cup
Ladbrokes Puppy Derby
Trafalgar Cup
Ladbrokes Gold Cup Festival 630
Ladbrokes Spring Festival 630
Ladbrokes Summer Stayers Classic

Track records

Current

Previous (post-metric)

Previous (pre-metric)

References 

Greyhound racing venues in the United Kingdom
Speedway venues in England
Sport in Wolverhampton
Sports venues in the West Midlands (county)